The Belarusian Great Patriotic War Museum is a museum in Minsk, Belarus.

The conception of a museum commemorating the Great Patriotic War after the end of Nazi occupation sprung up even before the close of the war. The museum first opened shortly after the liberation of Minsk from the Nazi invaders, on 25 October 1944, making it the first World War II museum to open during the course of the war. It moved to its current location in 2014.

The museum has 24 exhibition halls.  As of 2012 there were 142,676 items in the museum's collection.

The museum staff also engages in historical research: particular areas include Belarusians in the Red Army, local anti-fascist and partisan activity, and the history of the Auschwitz death camp.

Gallery

External links

 Official site

References

1944 establishments in Belarus
History museums in Belarus
Military and war museums
Museums established in 1944
Museums in Minsk
World War II museums